Los Gringos is a 1999 computer animated short created and written by Anders J. L. Beer and written/directed by Rob Letterman. It was an official selection for the 2000 Sundance Film Festival.

Cast
 John Leader as Narrator
 Pat Morita as Samurai
 Charles Napier as Gringo Cowboy

References

External links 

 
 Los Gringos at TMC.com

1999 films
American comedy short films
1999 comedy films
1999 animated films
1990s American animated films
American animated short films
Films directed by Rob Letterman
Films scored by Michael Giacchino
1990s English-language films